Matvey Vladislavovich Lukin (born 27 April 2004) is a Russian footballer who plays as a defender for CSKA Moscow.

Club career
Lukin made his debut for CSKA Moscow on 31 August 2022 in a Russian Cup game against Torpedo Moscow. He made his Russian Premier League debut for CSKA on 29 October 2022 against Lokomotiv Moscow, he played the full game and was chosen player of the match.

Career statistics

References

External links
 
 
 
 

Living people
2004 births
Russian footballers
Association football midfielders
Russia youth international footballers
Russian Premier League players
PFC CSKA Moscow players